Monnapule MESSI Saleng (born 13 March 1998) is a South African professional soccer player who plays as a winger for Orlando Pirates and the South Africa national team.

Club career
Having started his career at Orbit College in the SAFA Second Division, Saleng joined Free State Stars in 2019. He was the top scorer in the 2020–21 National First Division, scoring 13 goals in 29 matches.

Saleng signed for South African Premier Division club Orlando Pirates in July 2021, but spent the 2021–22 season on loan at Moroka Swallows, where he scored twice in 22 league appearances. He returned to Pirates for the 2022–23 season, where he became a first-team regular, scoring five goals in eight matches in the opening half of the season.

International career
Saleng was part of the South Africa squad at the 2021 COSAFA Cup, starting in the opening 1–0 victory against Botswana. In total, he made 6 appearances as South Africa won the tournament.

In November 2022, Saleng was included in the South Africa squad for two friendly fixtures against Angola and Mozambique.

References

1998 births
Living people
South African soccer players
South Africa international soccer players
Association football wingers
Free State Stars F.C. players
Orlando Pirates F.C. players
Moroka Swallows F.C. players
South African Premier Division players
National First Division players